Los Angeles is the second studio album by American electronic music producer Flying Lotus, released on July 9, 2008 by Warp Records. The cover was designed by British graphic design agency Build featuring photography by Timothy Saccenti, and the album title is named after Flying Lotus' place of birth.

Critical reception

At Metacritic, which assigns a weighted average score out of 100 to reviews from mainstream critics, Los Angeles received an average score of 81 based on 13 reviews, indicating "universal acclaim".

Resident Advisor ranked Los Angeles as the third best album of 2008, while Fact ranked it as the year's tenth best album. Pitchfork placed it at number 28 on its list of the best albums of 2008. In 2017, Los Angeles ranked at number 14 on Pitchforks list of "The 50 Best IDM Albums of All Time".

Track listing
All songs produced by Flying Lotus except where noted.

Charts

References

External links

2008 albums
Albums produced by Flying Lotus
Flying Lotus albums
Intelligent dance music albums
Warp (record label) albums